The Konami Code (Konami Komando, "Konami command"), also commonly referred to as the Contra Code and sometimes the 30 Lives code, is a cheat code that appears in many Konami video games, as well as some non-Konami games. In the original code, the player has to press the following sequence of buttons on the game controller to enable a cheat or other effects:

The code has also found a place in popular culture as a reference to the third generation of video game consoles, and is present as an Easter egg in a number of websites.

History
The Konami Code was first used in the release of Gradius (1986), a scrolling shooter for the NES and was popularized among North American players in the NES version of Contra. The code is also known as the "Contra Code" and "30 Lives Code", since the code provided the player 30 extra lives in Contra. The code has been used to help non-expert players to progress through the game.

The Konami Code was created by Kazuhisa Hashimoto, who was developing the home port of the 1985 arcade game Gradius for the NES. Finding the game too difficult to play through during testing, he created the cheat code, which gives the player a full set of power-ups (normally attained gradually throughout the game). After entering the sequence using the controller when the game was paused the player received all available power-ups. The code was meant to be removed prior to publishing, but this was overlooked and only discovered as the game was being prepared for mass production. The developers decided to leave it there, as removing it could result in new bugs and glitches. The sequence was easy enough to remember for testers and simultaneously sufficiently hard to enter accidentally during the gameplay for unsuspecting users.

The Konami Code was thus included in the series' other sequels and spin-offs, with some key differences. The code has been subsequently re-used in a large number of other games and other computer programs.

Examples

Tokimeki Memorial  – Entering the code allows the player to unlock special features in the game and also extra power ups in the Twin Bee mini game. Similar cheats are applied to other games in the series.
 Anno 1800 (Ubisoft Blue Byte, Windows) - Entering the code within the gameworld spawns hundreds of random animals flying through the air and chaotically bouncing off the terrain.
 BioShock Infinite (Irrational Games, Windows, Xbox 360, Xbox One, PlayStation 3, PlayStation 4, Nintendo Switch) A variation of the Konami Code at the game's menus unlocks the game's more difficult "1999 Mode" from the start.
 Dead by Daylight (Windows, Xbox One, PS4, Nintendo Switch) - When the code is entered while having one of the Silent Hill characters equipped on the main menu, the game plays a jingle from Gradius and grants the player a charm that can be equipped by characters.
 Fortnite Battle Royale (Windows, MacOS, Xbox One, PlayStation 4, Nintendo Switch, Mobile) The Konami code was used to access the Fortnite Durr Burger minigame at the black hole screen after the end of the Chapter 1 Season X event. It was only available for a period of 38 hours starting from 7:00pm UTC on October 13, 2019 and was no longer accessible on the start of Fortnite: Chapter 2.
 LittleBigPlanet 2 (Media Molecule, PlayStation 3). When entered in the unused arcade machine at the level "Set the Controls for the Heart of the Negativatron" (PlayStation 3 variation of the code), the machine explodes and unveils a square with the numbers "3733 5683", which on a mobile keypad, spell the phrase "free love".
 The Incredibles (THQ and Heavy Iron Studios, Windows, Mac, Xbox, PS2) – Inputting the code into the cheats keyboard "UUDDLRLRBAS" gives the player 25% health, and can be used an unlimited number of times.
 Ninja Raiden (browsers, Windows) – Enter the Konami code at the title screen l. The classic Gradius sound will confirm the code when the game starts. The game will run at 100% speed (normal game runs at 90%), Raiden will wear the Desperado skin, and as the game is faster (i.e., harder), the stage ranks will be raised one level. This code is necessary to achieve the S+ rank. Upon game completion (online only), the "Konami fan" achievement will appear in the leaderboards, next to the score.
 Ratchet & Clank: Up Your Arsenal (PS2) – Entering the code during vid-comic play, will dress Qwark up in a pink tutu. In the PS3 version, whether by accident or design, two debug codes were left in the game by the developers.
 Sportsfriends (PS3, PS4) The code allows to play FLOP, a wiggly variant of Pong. A similar code accesses the hidden game Get on Top.
 Touhou Soujinengi The Genius of Sappheiros (Strawberry Bose, Windows, PSVita) – Unlocking Fujiwara no Mokou early: After visiting Hieda no Akyuu for the first time, talk another time with her. The Bamboo Forest maze will appear to the west; head there, and travel through the forest in accordance with the Konami Code to find Mokou.
 Unchained Nostalgia (NES) – Unlocks secret mode.
 Yu-Gi-Oh! The Falsebound Kingdom (GameCube) The Konami code can be used during any map to gain gold. This will also trigger hidden dialog of a man shouting Yu-Gi-Oh.
  Just Dance 3 (Wii, Xbox 360, PS3) Inputting a part of the code on the title screen unlocks the extreme version of Barbra Streisand.
 Bloodstained: Ritual of the Night, a spiritual sequel to Castlevania developed by Koji Igarashi, lets players enter a "1986 Mode" that makes the game's controls more similar to the more-difficult Castlevania series by entering the Konami Code at a menu screen.
Tetris Effect (PS4, Xbox One) Entering the code at the launch screen enables a second screen accepting a code. Inputting the number "06061984" (representing June 6, 1984, the "birth date" of Tetris) will then unlock the "1984" level.
Adventure Time: Hey Ice King! Why'd You Steal Our Garbage?!! (Nintendo DS, 3DS) Inputting the code on the title screen results in an animated looping clip of an 8-bit recreation of Adventure Time's creator, Pendleton Ward dancing. To the left of Mr. Ward is an 8-bit version of Jake, and to the right, an 8-bit version of Finn.

Uses outside of video games
Entering a version of the Konami code in the Opera Browser activates hidden advanced settings.
A variation of the Konami code is used to reset the Netflix program on some devices.
 Entering the code on the Overwatch website will make several icons of the in-game spray of the playable character D.Va appear along with her voice actor saying "up up down down left right left right b a start". In the lore of Overwatch, she is a gamer.
 Entering the code on any Discord Error 404 website will unlock a secret game of snake.
 Entering the code on the 2016 Marks and Spencer Christmas food ordering site results in some festive creatures popping up.
 Entering the code on the Megaport website enables a Snake-like game which the user can play.
 Entering the Konami Code on the Bank of Canada's website for the commemorative $10 dollar bill plays a chiptune version of the Canadian national anthem and drops commemorative $10 notes.
 Entering the code on a Google Hangouts conversation and pressing enter will change the background of the conversation typed in.
 Reciting the code to Google Assistant will cause it to say either "Cheat mode enabled.", "You destroyed the Vile Red Falcon and saved the universe. Consider yourself a hero" with a trophy emoji or a similar response.
 Reciting the code to Apple's virtual assistant Siri will cause her to give one of three responses: "Cheater!", "Nerd." or "I'm getting dizzy...".
 Reciting the code to Amazon's Alexa will cause her to say: "Ding Ding Ding Ding Ding! Great job, you've secured all the power-ups!", "Sorry, so close, no power-ups for you." or "Super Alexa mode, activated. Starting reactors, online. Enabling advanced systems, online. Raising dongers. Error. Dongers missing. Aborting."
Entering the code on Terrarias home page will cause slimes to start coming in from the side of the screen.
 Entering the code on the WWF-UK website will cause the panda logo to spin.
 Entering the code on the Twitch Creator's Dashboard brings up several advanced options for the program.
 At one point, the Facebook website contained an Easter Egg where after entering the Konami code, a lens flare would be generated whenever the user would scroll or click anywhere on the page.
The Chromebook Pixel has an Easter egg where inputting the Konami Code would cause the lights on an LED strip on the lid of the computer to blink rapidly.
The code was part of the secret URL for the Linus Tech Tips "Verified Gamer" program to counter the Great GPU Shortage.
Entering the code in FORCE will display FORCE in rotating letters and cycling colors.
Within the Unreal Engine 5 demonstration program Valley of the Ancient, entering the Konami Code will cause the giant robot within it to dab.
Typing upupdowndownleftrightleftrightbastart on some Palm/HP webOS devices enables developer mode.
Two Fisher-Price toys, one modelled after a game controller, and another modelled after a Game Boy (which both show various lights and sounds when the buttons are pressed) presents a special sequence of lights and sounds if the Konami code is entered.
King Candy in the film Wreck-It Ralph uses the Konami code to access a locked portion of Sugar Rush'''s code.

References

External links
 Video about the Konami Code  from the G4 TV show Cheat!''

Konami
Easter egg (media)
Cheating in video games
Internet memes
Video game memes
1986 introductions
1986 in video gaming